The 2021–22 Coastal Carolina Chanticleers women's basketball team represented Coastal Carolina University during the 2021–22 NCAA Division I women's basketball season. The basketball team, led by eighth-year head coach Jaida Williams, played all home games at the HTC Center along with the Coastal Carolina Chanticleers men's basketball team. They were members of the Sun Belt Conference.

Roster

Schedule and results

|-
!colspan=9 style=| Non-conference Regular Season
|-

|-
!colspan=9 style=| Conference Regular Season
|-

|-
!colspan=9 style=| Sun Belt Tournament

See also
 2021–22 Coastal Carolina Chanticleers men's basketball team

References

Coastal Carolina Chanticleers women's basketball seasons
Coastal Carolina Chanticleers
Coastal Carolina Chanticleers women's basketball
Coastal Carolina Chanticleers women's basketball